Shchedrin (Щедрин) is the name of a Eastern European shtetl and a Russian surname. It may refer to:
 Shchedrin (village), also known as Scadryn
 Grigori Shchedrin (1912–1995), Soviet submariner
 Mikhail Saltykov-Shchedrin (1826–1889), Russian writer
 Rodion Shchedrin (born 1932), Russian composer
 Semyon Shchedrin (1745–1804), Russian painter
 Sylvester Shchedrin (1791–1830), Russian painter
 4625 Shchedrin, an asteroid 

Russian-language surnames